Combs Reservoir is a canal-feeder reservoir in the Peak District National Park, close to Combs village in Derbyshire.

Combs was built in 1797 as the first reservoir to feed the Peak Forest Canal (which opened in 1800) at Whaley Bridge. The canal was critical for transporting goods to and from the corn mills, cotton factories, collieries, and other local industries, as well as connecting to the Ashton Canal for the nearby limestone quarries. In 1831 the Macclesfield Canal was completed, which was connected to the Peak Forest Canal at Marple. The Toddbrook Reservoir at Whaley Bridge was built as an additional feeder reservoir and the dam at Combs Reservoir was raised between 1834 and 1840, in order to meet the demand for a greater water supply to the extended canal system. By the 1940s use of these canals for transporting industrial goods had ended. The reservoir is now owned by the Canal & River Trust.

The Buxton to Manchester railway line runs between Combs Reservoir and Combs village to the south and alongside the western shore.

The reservoir is overlooked by Eccles Pike hill from the north and from the south by the Iron Age promontory hillfort Castle Naze, at the northern end of Combs Moss. Castle Naze is a protected Scheduled monument.

Combs Reservoir is a designated Site of Special Scientific Interest (SSSI). It is particularly important for its 'ephemeral bryophyte' mosses (such as the rare Physcomitrium sphaericum) and liverworts (Ricca glauca and Fossombronia wondraczekii). The area is a rich habitat for birdlife including the great crested grebe, little ringed plover, snipe and lapwing.

Combs Sailing Club has used the reservoir for sailing training and racing since 1950.

References 

Reservoirs of the Peak District
Reservoirs in Derbyshire
Sites of Special Scientific Interest in Derbyshire
Peak District